SM UC-6 was a German Type UC I minelayer submarine or U-boat in the German Imperial Navy during World War I. The U-boat had been ordered by November 1914 and was launched on 20 June 1915. She was commissioned into the German Imperial Navy on 24 June 1915 as SM UC-6. Mines laid by UC-6 in her 89 patrols were credited with sinking 55 ships.

Design
A German Type UC I submarine, UC-6 had a displacement of  when at the surface and  while submerged. The submarine was powered by one Daimler-Motoren-Gesellschaft six-cylinder, four-stroke diesel engine producing , an electric motor producing , and one propeller shaft.

UC-6 was fitted with six  mine tubes, twelve UC 120 mines, and one  machine gun. She was built by AG Vulcan Stettin and her complement was fourteen crew members.

Fate
UC-6 sailed from Zeebrugge on 27 September 1917 to lay mines off the Kentish Knock and did not return. She was later reported by British patrols that strong explosions had occurred in explosive nets laid in the area that same day. Other sources, however, state that UC-6 was destroyed by a British seaplane on 28 September 1917.

Summary of raiding history

Notes

References

Bibliography

External links
 Knott, Peta (2015) 'UC-6 THames Estuary: Archaeological Report'
 Historic England Project to research First World War Submarines 

German Type UC I submarines
U-boats commissioned in 1915
World War I submarines of Germany
Maritime incidents in 1917
U-boats sunk in 1917
U-boats sunk by mines
1915 ships
World War I minelayers of Germany
Ships built in Hamburg
World War I shipwrecks in the North Sea
Ships lost with all hands